Antoine Guenée (23 November 1717 – 27 November 1803) was a French priest and Christian apologist, born at Étampes.

He wrote, besides various apologetic works, Lettres de Quelques Juifs Portugais, Allemands et Polonais, à M. de Voltaire, Paris, 1769, often reprinted and translated into English and other languages. Along with the prominent Sephardic Jew, Isaac De Pinto, Guenée defends the Jews against Voltaire's criticisms of their religion and way of life.

References

1717 births
1803 deaths
People from Étampes
18th-century French Roman Catholic priests
Christian apologists